The Honor Guard Company of the Moldovan National Army is an honor guard unit of the Armed Forces of the Republic of Moldova. Founded on 22 June 1992, it is part of the National Army's Guard Battalion. To be eligible for the honor guard, one should be at least , have strong health, and have a pleasant appearance.

Activities
The unit participates in over 250 ceremonies, including the ceremonies of the appointment of foreign diplomats, and state award ceremonies and welcome ceremonies. The members of the company also have participated in military parades in Romania, Bulgaria, France, Ukraine and other countries. It commonly performs military rituals on public holidays such as Victory Day, Independence Day and Liberation Day. Daily training in front and specialist training lasts for 4 hours. Currently, it is the only unit in the armed forces to utilize the goose step. In 2012, President Nicolae Timofti described it as "the Visit Card of the Republic of Moldova".

Parades
In Moldova, there is one parade during which it is an active participant, the Chișinău Independence Day Parade on 27 August that takes place every 5 years. In 2010, a 76 (70 on parade with 6 in reserve) man contingent from the company took part in the Moscow Victory Day Parade on Red Square, arriving by train days prior and staying at lodging in Naro-Fominsk and Alabino. Although there were concerns over financial difficulties in transporting the contingent, parliament speaker Marian Lupu stated nonetheless that "It is a pride for Moldova that its soldiers marched on the Red Square". The year before, it took part in a parade on Prince Alexander of Battenberg Square in Sofia, Bulgaria, leading a military band during the Bulgarian Armed Forces Day parade. It also took part in the 2020 Moscow Victory Day Parade at the same venue in honor of the war's 75th anniversary. The company's participation in the 2020 parade drew criticism by politicians, with former Defence Minister Anatol Salaru saying that the parade could expose the company to COVID-19. A three-member color guard represented the country at the 2014 Bastille Day military parade in Paris. According to Vitalie Josan, the now commander of the company who was the flag bearer in while in France, the contingent from the New Zealand Defence Force assumed the uniform was not useful when worn in the field, to which he responded by revealing that it has more resistance than other field uniforms, having been tested in polygons. The unit for the first time represented the country in a parade in Romania in 2014. The parade, which was held on Great Union Day, was held through the Arcul de Triumf in central Bucharest. In 2018, the unit (led by Vasile Ojoga) represented Moldova at the Kyiv Independence Day Parade on Maidan Nezalezhnosti, which also saw 14 other contingents from NATO and Ukraine allied armed services. It returned to Kiev with a limited contingent in 2021 led by Captain Victor Shipilov.

Changing of the Guard Ceremony
The ceremony of the changing of the guards is performed by members of the company at the Eternity Memorial Complex in Chisinau. It is performed by three soldiers and one officer wearing their service uniform. The ceremony is done hourly and is similar to the ceremony in Moscow. Guards stand at attention in all types of weather, as well as during ceremonies such as the laying of wreaths at the monument.

Recognition
After the returning from the Moscow parade in 2020 and upon returning from a two-week quarantine that followed, members of the company were awarded with army decoration by President Dodon and Defence Minister Alexandru Pînzari.

Commanders
Major Igor Procop (circa 2010)
Captain Vitalie Josan (? - circa 2021)
Captain Victor Shipilov (interim) (circa 2021)

Gallery

See also
 SKS
 Honor Guard of the Armed Forces of Belarus
 Guard mounting
 Presidential Band of the Republic of Moldova
 Kyiv Presidential Honor Guard Battalion
 Michael the Brave 30th Guards Brigade

External links
 Garda de Onoare la 25 de ani
 GARDA DE ONOARE
 Garda de Onoare 25 ani
 Onor la Paris
 Молдавские военные примут участие в параде

References

Military units and formations of Moldova
Moldova
1992 establishments in Moldova
Military units and formations established in 1992